Saugus High School may refer to:

 Saugus High School (California), a public high school in Santa Clarita, Los Angeles County, California, U.S.
 2019 Saugus High School shooting
 Saugus High School (Massachusetts), a public high school in Saugus, Essex County, Massachusetts, U.S.